The 2015 Suffolk Coastal District Council election took place on 7 May 2015 to elect members of the Suffolk Coastal District Council in England. It was held on the same day as other local elections. This was the last election for Suffolk Coastal District Council.

Results Summary

References

2015 English local elections
May 2015 events in the United Kingdom
2015
2010s in Suffolk